Micol Cattaneo (born 13 May 1982) is an Italian athlete who competes mainly in the 100 metres hurdles. She represented Italy at the 2008 Olympic Games in Beijing, China. In the season 2018–2019 she also competed as bobsledder.

Biography
Cattaneo was born in Como, Italy. In the 100 metres hurdles, she won a silver medal at the 2007 Military World Games and a bronze medal at the 2009 Mediterranean Games. In the 4 × 100 metres relay, she won gold medals at the 2007 Military World Games and the 2013 Mediterranean Games.

Her personal best time of 12.98s was set on 22 June 2008 in Annecy, France. Later that year she competed at the Olympic Games in Beijing, where she was eliminated in the heats, running 13.13s.

She is the daughter of the former Italian football player Giuseppe Cattaneo. She has 17 international appearances for the Italian national team from 2003 to 2012.

Achievements

National titles
Cattaneo has won 9 senior national championship titles.
5 wins  Italian 100 metres hurdles Champion (2005, 2007, 2008, 2009, 2017)
4 wins Italian Indoor 60 metres hurdles Champion (2005, 2007, 2008, 2009)

See also
 Italian all-time lists – 100 metres hurdles
 Italy at the Military World Games
 Italy national relay team

References

External links
 
 Athlete profile at The-sports.org
 

1982 births
Living people
Sportspeople from Como
Italian female hurdlers
Olympic athletes of Italy
Athletics competitors of Centro Sportivo Carabinieri
Athletes (track and field) at the 2008 Summer Olympics
Italian female bobsledders
Mediterranean Games gold medalists for Italy
Mediterranean Games bronze medalists for Italy
Mediterranean Games medalists in athletics
Athletes (track and field) at the 2009 Mediterranean Games
Athletes (track and field) at the 2013 Mediterranean Games
20th-century Italian women
21st-century Italian women